As U Like or As You Like 'Nin Say Yin' is a 2013 Burmese drama film produced by Sein Htay Film Production. It was based on Nay Naw's novel. It was directed by Wyne (Own Creator). Pyay Ti Oo, Min Oo and Wut Hmone Shwe Yi starred as the main characters.

Plot
A very beloved couple Moe Sway and Wut Yee Cho got separated for some reason. Moe Sway loved her so much that he told her 'I would die if it is what you like'. One day, when they meet again when Moe Sway found out that his love Wut Yee Cho had changed in so many ways. She even changed her name as GaGa. Then GaGa realised that they couldn't ever be together with her situation like this and the tragedy story goes on.

Cast
 Pyay Ti Oo as Moe Sway
 Min Oo as Thiha Sithu
 Wut Hmone Shwe Yi as Wut Yee Cho/GaGa

Awards
The film won the Best Actor Pyay Ti Oo, Actress Wut Hmone Shwe Yi , and Best Supporting Actor Min Oo of the year 2013 in Myanmar Motion Picture Academy Awards which was held on 27 December 2014.

Script NayNaw
နင်စေရင် ဇာတ်ညွှန်းဆု အကယ်ဒမီ စကာတင်  nomination စာရင်းဝင်ခဲ့သည်။ ဇာတ်ညွှန်းမှာ စာရေးဆရာနေနော် NayNaw ဖြစ် သည်။

References

Burmese drama films
2013 films
2010s Burmese-language films
Films directed by Wyne